Keith D. Kidwell (born June 21, 1961) is a  Republican member of the North Carolina House of Representatives. He has represented the 79th district (including constituents in Beaufort and Craven counties) since its creation in a mid-cycle redistricting in 2019.

Involvement with the Oath Keepers
In late September 2021, it was revealed that Rep. Kidwell's name was among the some 38,000 people whose names appear on a membership roster of the Oath Keepers; a far-right anti-government militia, following a hack of the group's internal data. Rep. Kidwell did not comment on whether he is a member of the group or not. However, records show that Kidwell has been on the Oath Keepers' roster since at least 2012.

Committee assignments

2021-2022 session
Banking (Chair)
Finance (Chair)
Agriculture
Commerce
Environment
Regulatory Reform
Judiciary IV
Marine Resources and Aqua Culture

2019-2020 session
Finance
Commerce
Environment
Regulatory Reform
Pensions and Retirement

Electoral history

2022

2020

2018

References

1961 births
Living people
People from Passaic, New Jersey
Politicians from Passaic, New Jersey
People from Beaufort County, North Carolina
William Paterson University alumni
21st-century American politicians
Republican Party members of the North Carolina House of Representatives